Central Peel Secondary School is a high school that is located in Brampton, Ontario, Canada, and it is operated by the Peel District School Board. , the school enrollment stood at 1,216. Central Peel first opened its doors in 1960. The school's mission is "...to work as a diverse learning community in which all members strive to understand and develop their full potential."

Academics 
Central Peel teaches under the curriculum guidelines of the Peel District School Board. Central Peel offers course selection at the academic, applied, essential (locally developed), and open levels in grade 9 and 10 as well as university, college and workplace preparation levels in grade 11 and 12. The school offers courses pertaining to the essential disciplines required for completion of the Ontario Secondary School Diploma. Central Peel is continually growing into a discipline school. It offers uniforms, has an advanced placement program, and a strings program.

Disciplines
Students may choose to select from a wide number of courses in art, business studies, Canadian and world studies, computer studies, English including English as a second language, French as a second language, guidance and career education, health and physical education, mathematics, science, social science and humanities, as well as technological education.

The Arts
Art courses include studies in dance, drama, media arts, music including band, keyboard, percussion, vocal/choral, guitar, software, as well as visual art including photography. Central Peel also offers strings courses in which students can learn four different string instruments (violin, viola, cello, bass). Classes in the Strings program are divided by the level of proficiency at which a student plays.

Business studies
Business studies at Central Peel range from information technology, business theory, business technology, accounting, marketing, communications, entrepreneurship, organizational studies, and international business.  Central Peel also offers a Specialist High Skills major in business studies.

Canadian and world studies
Courses available at Central Peel pertaining to the study of Canada and the world include Canadian Geography, Canadian History, civics, geography, travel and tourism, Canadian politics, Canadian citizenship, American history, world history, Canadian law, environmental and resource management, world relations, world issues, economics and international law.

English
Central Peel offers the required study to advance knowledge of the English language for native speakers as well as a chance to specialize in Media, Canadian Literature, Literature, and Writing. Central Peel also offers English as a second Language (ESL), and English Literacy Development (ELD) for those who are learning English as a second language.

Moderns
Central Peel also offers students the chance to study French as a second language.

Guidance and career education
Career Studies as well as leadership and peer support courses are available to Central Peel students. Central Peel also offers students the chance to find co-operative education through its Co-Op office.

Health and physical education
Along with traditional gym class (Healthy Active Living Education) in both open and ESL, Central Peel also offers a specialty in fitness (weight room), exercise science, and overall health. Several recreation courses are also available. Along with their business specialty, the school also offers a sports Specialist High Skills Major.

Mathematics
Central Peel's Mathematics department provides students with the chance to expand their knowledge of mathematical principles (academic), foundations (applied) or essential concepts (locally developed) in grades 9 and 10. Students can choose from a selection of mathematical functions, college mathematics, workplace mathematics, advanced functions, calculus and vectors, as well as data management in the senior grades (11 and 12). The school also offers students the opportunity to participate in math contests, most of which are organized by the University of Waterloo, as well as Computer Science contests.

Science
Along with general science offered in the junior grades, Central Peel allows students to select specialty science courses pertaining to biology, chemistry, physics, environmental science, and earth science in grades 11 and 12. Environmental science and earth science have both been cancelled recently in the past due to low enrollment.

Social science and humanities
The Social sciences department at Central Peel offers courses in Family Living, Food and Nutrition, Personal and Family Resources, Fashion, Parenting in a fully functioning daycare, World Religion, Anthropology, Law (Canadian and International), assorted History courses, as well as Human Growth and Development.

Technological education
Central Peel's Technology department offers students opportunities to develop technological skills. Students may study hairstyling and aestheticsin a mock hair salon (The Snippin Griffin), take part in construction technology study and practice in a wood shop, study communications in a computer lab, design in a design studio, as well as transportation technology in an auto shop. Along with these unique opportunities students may also expand their knowledge of technology in health care and green industries courses.

Athletics
Central Peel offers students a chance to participate in school teams, intramurals and program management.

School teams
All of Central Peel's extra curricular teams compete within The Region of Peel Secondary Schools Athletic Association (ROPSSAA). School teams include basketball for boys and girls at the junior and senior levels, girl's varsity flag football, boys varsity volleyball as well as girls junior and senior teams, boys varsity baseball, girls varsity softball, tennis for boys and girls, wrestling, golf, boys varsity ice hockey, track & field, marathon, cross country running, boys junior senior and girls varsity cricket, boys and girls soccer and boys varsity lacrosse. Central Peel also has a co-ed volleyball team, a co-ed ultimate frisbee team and a boys' indoor soccer team which do not compete within ROPPSSA but assemble annually to take part in local sports tournaments.

Advanced Placement
Central Peel offers an Advanced Placement program. For the majority of students, enrollment and acceptance into the program involves a two-step admission process, including a written application and formal assessment testing both mathematics and english proficiency; the content of this admissions test is based solely on Ontario curriculum grade appropriate content and does not require special training or studying. Central Peel has offered the program since 2012-2013, with a pilot program for AP calculus launching the year prior. The program has produced some of Canada's top academics including Kiana Moazzami. As part of the program, Central Peel offers a variety of AP courses which can be taken only by students who are in the program. Formal AP Exam testing is offered by the school on campus with selection available for all exams with offered class counterparts, exams for non-offered subjects can also be specially requested by students who wish to self-study the material.

Alumni

See also
List of High schools in Ontario

References

External links

Rapid Facts: Central Peel Secondary School at the Peel District School Board site

Peel District School Board
High schools in Brampton
Educational institutions established in 1960
1960 establishments in Ontario